Washington Hotel, also known as Washington House, is a historic hotel building located at Greenfield, Dade County, Missouri. It was built in 1882 and expanded between 1900 and 1910, and is a 2 1/2-story, painted brick building with modest Italianate style detailing. It consists of a central block with flanking wings.  It sits on a raised basement and has a low-pitched hipped roof with dormers. The hotel closed in the late-1960s. It was later destroyed. 

It was listed on the National Register of Historic Places in 2002.

References

Hotel buildings on the National Register of Historic Places in Missouri
Italianate architecture in Missouri
Hotel buildings completed in 1882
Buildings and structures in Dade County, Missouri
National Register of Historic Places in Dade County, Missouri